The 1994–95 daytime network television schedule for the four of the six major English-language commercial broadcast networks in the United States covers the weekday and weekend daytime hours from September 1994 to August 1995.

Legend

 New series are highlighted in bold.

Schedule
 All times correspond to U.S. Eastern and Pacific Time scheduling (except for some live sports or events). Except where affiliates slot certain programs outside their network-dictated timeslots, subtract one hour for Central, Mountain, Alaska, and Hawaii-Aleutian times.
 Local schedules may differ, as affiliates have the option to pre-empt or delay network programs. Such scheduling may be limited to preemptions caused by local or national breaking news or weather coverage (which may force stations to tape delay certain programs in overnight timeslots or defer them to a co-operated station or digital subchannel in their regular timeslot) and any major sports events scheduled to air in a weekday timeslot (mainly during major holidays). Stations may air shows at other times at their preference.
 In 1995, a majority of stations that were affiliated with ABC, CBS, NBC, or were independents, had switched affiliations to Fox, with the 3 networks, or became independents, thus altering the network daytime schedule in several markets due to contractual obligations involving syndication programs or scheduling conflicts. However, some that switched affiliations did follow the schedule.

Monday–Friday

Saturday

Fox Kids Network note: In September, Where on Earth Is Carmen Sandiego? aired at 10:30AM  and The Tick aired at 11:30AM.

Sunday

By network

ABC

Returning series:
ABC Weekend Special
ABC World News This Morning
ABC World News Tonight with Peter Jennings
The Addams Family 
All My Children
The Bugs Bunny and Tweety Show
Cro
General Hospital
Good Morning America
Loving
Mike and Maty
One Life to Live
Schoolhouse Rock!
Sonic the Hedgehog
Tales from the Cryptkeeper
This Week with David Brinkley

New series:
Bump in the Night
Free WillyFudge
ReBootNot returning from 1993-94:CityKidsHomeWild West C.O.W.-Boys of Moo MesaCBS

Returning series:As the World TurnsBeakman's WorldThe Bold and the BeautifulCBS Evening NewsCBS Morning NewsCBS Storybreak CBS News Sunday MorningCBS This MorningThe Little MermaidFace the NationGarfield and FriendsGuiding LightThe Price Is RightTeenage Mutant Ninja TurtlesThe Young and the RestlessNew series:AladdinBeethovenThe MaskSkeleton WarriorsWild C.A.T.sNot returning from 1993-94:Cadillacs and Dinosaurs
Conan and the Young Warriors
All-New Dennis the Menace
Marsupilami

FoxReturning series:The Adventures of Batman & Robin
Animaniacs
Bobby's World
Dog City
Droopy, Master Detective
Eek! Stravaganza
Mighty Morphin Power Rangers
Taz-Mania
Tiny Toon Adventures 
Where on Earth Is Carmen Sandiego?
X-MenNew series:The Fox CubhouseSpider-ManThe TickNot returning from 1993-94:Merrie Melodies Starring Bugs Bunny & Friends
The Terrible Thunderlizards
Thunderbirds USA
Tom & Jerry Kids

NBCReturning series:Another World
California Dreams
Days of Our Lives
The Jane Whitney Show
Leeza
Meet the Press
Name Your Adventure
NBA Inside Stuff
NBC News at Sunrise
NBC Nightly News
Saturday Today
Saved by the Bell: The New Class
TodayNew series:The Other SideNot returning from 1993-94:'Brains and BrawnCaesars ChallengeClassic Concentration Running the Halls''

See also
1994-95 United States network television schedule (prime-time)
1994-95 United States network television schedule (late night)

References

Sources
https://web.archive.org/web/20071015122215/http://curtalliaume.com/abc_day.html
https://web.archive.org/web/20071015122235/http://curtalliaume.com/cbs_day.html
https://web.archive.org/web/20071012211242/http://curtalliaume.com/nbc_day.html

United States weekday network television schedules
1994 in American television
1995 in American television